Belad Motaleb-e Sofla (also Romanized as Belād Moţaleb-e Soflá and Balād Maţlab-e Soflá; also known as Badmutlab, Balād Maţlab-e Pā’īn, Belād-e Moţalleb, and Belād Moţlab-e Seyyed Mosallam) is a village in Abdoliyeh-ye Sharqi Rural District, in the Central District of Ramshir County, Khuzestan Province, Iran. At the 2006 census, its population was 107, in 19 families.

References 

Populated places in Ramshir County